Zhuang Jia (Chinese: t , s , Zhuāng Jiǎ) (died 208 BC) was a 3rd-century BC Chinese rebel involved in the Dazexiang Uprising against the Qin dynasty. A charioteer, he assassinated the uprising's leader, Chen Sheng, in January 208 BC at Chen County. Zhuang was later killed by Lǚ Chen, a general under Chen Sheng, after Lǚ had occupied Chen County.

References

Qin dynasty people
Ancient rebels
Qin dynasty rebels
3rd-century BC Chinese people